Qaidan (also Romanized as Qā’īdān and Qāyedān) is a village in Hendudur Rural District, Sarband District, Shazand County, Markazi Province, Iran. At the 2006 census, its population was 423, in 85 families.

References 

Populated places in Shazand County